Harman Wayne "Pat" Patterson (May 1, 1889 – March 31, 1987) was a college football player and engineer.

Early years
Harman Wayne Patterson, known as Wayne or "Pat", was born on May 1, 1889, in San Francisco, California. His father, Colonel Robert Harman Patterson, was an army officer and the family moved often.

Georgia Tech
Patterson was a prominent tackle and fullback on John Heisman's Georgia Tech Golden Tornado football teams. He also kicked the extra points. Patterson also played baseball at Tech. He was inducted into the Tech Athletics Hall of Fame in 1977.

1910
Patterson was selected All-Southern as a football player in 1910.

1911
He was captain of its 1911 team which included the later coach William Alexander as a reserve quarterback. He was selected All-Southern by Dick Jemison in the Atlanta Constitution.

After college
Following graduation from Tech in 1912, Patterson worked for Stone and Webster, the firm building the Goat Rock Dam in Columbus, Georgia. He was a veteran of the First World War. In 1942, he became vice president and treasurer of the newly organized Home Builders Cooperative. Patterson retired as an electrical engineer for Georgia Power Company.

References

1889 births
1987 deaths
Players of American football from San Francisco
American football tackles
American football fullbacks
All-Southern college football players
Georgia Tech Yellow Jackets football players
Georgia Tech Yellow Jackets baseball players
Engineers from California